= NYFA =

NYFA may refer to:

- New York Film Academy
- New York Foundation for the Arts
